Princes Road Synagogue is a synagogue on Princes Road in the Toxteth district of Liverpool, England. It is the home of the Liverpool Old Hebrew Congregation. It was founded in the late 1860s, designed by William James Audsley and George Ashdown Audsley, and consecrated on 2 September 1874. It is widely regarded as the finest example of the Moorish Revival style of synagogue architecture in the UK, and synagogues emulating its design can be found as far away as Sydney.

History
Princes Road Synagogue came into existence when the Jewish community in Liverpool in the late 1860s decided to build a new synagogue, reflecting the status and wealth of the community. The Toxteth area was rapidly expanding as Liverpool's magnates built opulent mansions. The synagogue stands in a cluster of houses of worship designed to advertise the wealth and status of the local captains of industry, a group that was remarkably ethnically diverse by the standards of Victorian England; immediately adjacent to the synagogue on Princes Road are the Greek Orthodox Church of St Nicholas, the Church of England's parish of St Margaret of Antioch, and the Welsh Presbyterian Church.

The synagogue was designed by William James Audsley and George Ashdown Audsley, Scottish architect brothers from Edinburgh, and built at a cost of approximately £14,975. It was consecrated on 2 September 1874. The building has been described as "eclectic" and it has been said that the synagogue exemplifies the characteristic eclectic architecture in harmoniously blending features drawn from different styles.

The ladies of the Liverpool Old Hebrew Congregation held a bazaar and luncheon in February 1874. They invited the important dignitaries and arranged for the band of the Coldstream Guards to play. The event raised approximately £3,000 (equivalent to £346,920 in 2020) which was donated to the synagogue for the decoration of the interior. The synagogue is a testament to the wealth and social position of Liverpool's 19th-century Jewish magnates, a group with the wealth and taste to also commission Max Bruch to compose the Kol Nidre variations for cello and orchestra.

The synagogue today is attended only on Shabbat mornings and holidays, though it remains popular for weddings and b'nai mitzvah.

Description 
The synagogue is of brick construction, with bright terracotta bricks being used extensively for decoration. The façade reveals the plan of the building, a basilica with nave and aisles. The central section juts forward from the aisles. It has a large Moorish portal divided by a central column, above which is a large wheel window in the Romanesque style, both deeply recessed in arches.

The synagogue has a central nave with aisles on either side, separated by an arcade carried on slender octagonal columns, which also support galleries over the aisles. The nave has a barrel vault lit by clerestory windows. The interior is notable for its lavish decoration, including gilding and unstinting use of the finest woods and marbles. H. A. Meek was so impressed with the design that he wrote in his 1995 book The Synagogue, "He who has not seen the interior of Princes Road Synagogue in Liverpool has not beheld the glory of Israel."

Images

See also
Architecture of Liverpool
History of the Jews in England
Religion in England

References

External links

Art of Faith blog
http://www.liverpool.ndo.co.uk/gatsoc/news03/page23.html
https://www.visitliverpool.com/things-to-do/princes-road-synagogue-p7512
Liverpool Old Hebrew Congregation on Jewish Communities and Records – UK (hosted by jewishgen.org).

1860s establishments in England
Gothic Revival synagogues
Grade I listed buildings in Liverpool
Grade I listed religious buildings and structures
Moorish Revival architecture in the United Kingdom
Moorish Revival synagogues
Orthodox synagogues in England
Religion in Merseyside
Religious organizations established in the 1860s
Synagogues completed in 1874
Tourist attractions in Liverpool
Toxteth